This is an alphabetical list of fungal taxa as recorded from South Africa. Currently accepted names have been appended.

Ab
Genus Abrothallus Pérez-Ort. & Suija (2013),  Abrothallaceae (Lichenicolous fungi)
Abrothallus parmeliarum Nyl. (sic) probably  (Sommerf.) Arnold 1874

Ac

Genus Acarospora A.Massal. (1852) Acarosporaceae (Lichenised fiungi) 
Acarospora angolensis H. Magn. 1929
Acarospora austroafricana (Zahlbr.) H. Magn. 1933
Acarospora bella Jatta 1906
Acarospora bylii H. Magn. 1933
Acarospora calviniensis H. Magn. 1933
Acarospora capensis Zahlbr. 1926
Acarospora cervina A. Massal. (1852), 
Acarospora citrina (Taylor) Zahlbr. (1913).
Acarospora crassilabra (Müll. Arg.) Zahlbr. 1927
Acarospora deserticola Zahlbr. 1926
Acarospora finckei Zahlbr. 1927
Acarospora finckei var. lobulata H. Magn. ex Zahlbr. 1932
Acarospora fuscata (Ach.) Arnold (1871)
Acarospora immixta H. Magn. 1929
Acarospora initialis H. Magn. 1929
Acarospora initialis var. perfectior H. Magn. 1933
Acarospora insculpta H. Magn. 1933
Acarospora intermixta H. Magn. 1933
Acarospora intrusa H. Magn. 1933
Acarospora laeta H. Magn. 1933
Acarospora laeta var. annularis H. Magn. 1933
Acarospora laevigata H. Magn. 1933
Acarospora longispora H. Magn. 1933 
Acarospora lucida H. Magn. 1929
Acarospora luderitzensis H. Magn. 1933
Acarospora macrospora (Hepp ex Nyl.) A. Massal. ex Bagl. (1857)
Acarospora meridionalis H. Magn. 1932
Acarospora negligens H. Magn. (1929)
Acarospora ochrophaea H. Magn. 1933
Acarospora ortendahlii H.Magn.* 
Acarospora perexigua (Müll. Arg.) Hue 1909
Acarospora porinoides (Stizenb.) Zahlbr. 1927
Acarospora rhodesiae H. Magn. 1933
Acarospora socialis H. Magn. 1929
Acarospora steineri H. Magn. 1933
Acarospora subbadia H. Magn. 1933
Acarospora subochracea H. Magn. 1932
Acarospora subtersa  H. Magn. 1929
Acarospora sulphurata  var. austroafricana Zahlbr. 1926
Acarospora tenuis (Vain.) H. Magn. 1929
Acarospora tersa Zahlbr.(sic) probably (Fr.) J. Steiner 1897
Acarospora tersa var. bella (Ach.) Vain. ex Van der Byl 1931
Acarospora tersa var. tenuis Wain (sic) probably Vain. 1901
Acarospora tersa var. thaeodes Wain (sic) probably Vain. 1901
Acarospora tersa var. thaeodes Zahlbr.*
Acarospora thaeodes  A. Massal. 1861
Acarospora xanthophana (Nyl.) Jatta 1906

Family: Acarosporaceae Zahlbr. 1906

Genus: Achorion Remak 1845
Achorion schoenleinii Remak ex Guég. 1845, accepted as Trichophyton schoenleinii (Lebert) Langeron & Miloch. ex Nann., (1934)

Genus: Acremoniella Sacc. 1886
Acremoniella sp.

Genus: Acremonium Link 1809
Acremonium verticillatum Link 1809, accepted as Cladobotryum verticillatum (Link) S. Hughes, (1958)
Acremonium sp.

Genus: Acrospeira Berk. & Broome 1857
Acrospeira macrosporoidea (Berk. & Broome) Wiltshire 1938, accepted as Monodictys castaneae (Wallr.) S. Hughes, (1958)

Genus: Actinonema
Actinonema rosae (Lib.) Fr. 1849, accepted as Diplocarpon rosae (Lib.) F.A. Wolf, (1912)

Genus: Actinopeltella
Actinopeltella nitida Doidge 1924, accepted as Actinopeltis nitida (Doidge) Arx, (1962)

Ae

Genus: Aecidium Pers. 1796, accepted as Puccinia Pers., (1794), (Rust fungi)
Aecidium acalyphicolum Doidge*
Aecidium acanthopsidis Syd. & P. Syd. 1915
Aecidium albilabrum Kalchbr. 1871
Aecidium albo-atrum P.Henn.*
Aecidium anceps Syd. & P. Syd. 1901
Aecidium ancylanthi  Henn. 1903
Aecidium antholyzae Bubak*
Aecidium ari Desm. 1823 accepted as Puccinia sessilis J. Schröt., (1870) [1869]
Aecidium aroideum Cooke 1879
Aecidium australe Berk. 1843
Aecidium banketense Hopk. 1938 recorded as Aecidium banketensis
Aecidium barleriae  Doidge 1948
Aecidium baumanianum Henn. 1903,
Aecidium baumii P.Henn.*
Aecidium benguellense  Lagerh. 1889
Aecidium berkleyae Henn. & Pole-Evans 1908
Aecidium bicolor Sacc. 1899
Aecidium brideliae  Henn. & Pole-Evans 1908
Aecidium brunswigiae  Henn. 1898
Aecidium bulbines Henn. & Pole-Evans 1908
Aecidium burtt-davyi Doidge 1939
Aecidium bylianum Syd. 1924
Aecidium capense Berk. & M.A. Curtis 1860
Aecidium cardiospermi Cooke 1882 accepted as Dietelia cardiospermi (Cooke) Berndt & A.R. Wood, (2012) 
Aecidium cephalandrae Cooke 1884
Aecidium cephalariae Syd. & P. Syd. 1912
Aecidium chlorophyti Kalchbr. (sic) probably Har. & Pat. 1909
Aecidium clarum Syd. & P. Syd. 1912
Aecidium clematidis-brachiatae Doidge 1927
Aecidium clerodendricola Henn. 1903
Aecidium clutiae Doidge 1927 recorded as Aecidium cluytiae
Aecidium compositarum DC. (sic), possibly  Mart. 1817 accepted as Puccinia lapsanae Fuckel [as 'lampsanae'], (1860), or Rabenh. 1851
Aecidium conyzae-pinnatilobatae P. Syd. & Syd. 1923
Aecidium cookeanum De Toni 1888
Aecidium corycii Doidge 1927
Aecidium crini Kalchbr. 1882
Aecidium crypticum Kalchbr. & Cooke 1880
Aecidium cussoniae Kalchbr. 1882
Aecidium davyi Syd. & P. Syd. 1912,
Aecidium decipiens Syd. & P. Syd. 1923
Aecidium denekiae Doidge 1927
Aecidium dielsii Henn. 1902
Aecidium dinteri Doidge 1939
Aecidium diospyri A.L. Sm. 1898
Aecidium dipcadi-viridis Doidge 1948
Aecidium dissotidis Cooke 1882
Aecidium doidgeae Syd. & P. Syd.(1912) recorded as Aecidium doidgei 
Aecidium dolichi Cooke 1882 accepted as Synchytrium dolichi (Cooke) Gäum., (1927)
Aecidium dubiosum Syd. & P. Syd. 1901
Aecidium elegans Dietel 1888 accepted as Endophyllum macowanii Pole-Evans as 'macowani' (1909)  [1908]
Aecidium elytropappi  Henn. 1898 accepted as Endophyllum elytropappi (Henn.) A.R. Wood & Crous, (2005)
Aecidium englerianum Henn. & Lindau 1893
Aecidium eriospermi Henn. 1897
Aecidium evansii Henn. 1908
Aecidium fluggeae Doidge 1927
Aecidium flustra Berk. ex Syd. & P. Syd. 1923
Aecidium garckeanum Henn. 1891
Aecidium gomphostigmae Doidge 1927
Aecidium habunguense  Henn. 1903 accepted as Puccinia agrophila Syd., (1937)
Aecidium hartwegiae Thüm. 1877
Aecidium helichrysi Doidge 1927
Aecidium heliotropicola P.H.B. Talbot (1948) recorded as Aecidium heliotropicolum
Aecidium hoffmanni  P. Syd. & Syd. 1923
Aecidium hibisci Cooke 1892
Aecidium impatientis-capensis Doidge 1927
Aecidium incertum Syd. & P. Syd. 1901
Aecidium inornatum Kalchbr. 1882 accepted as Ravenelia inornata (Kalchbr.) Dietel, (1894)
Aecidium ipomoeae Thüm. 1840 accepted as Albugo ipomoeae-panduratae (Schwein.) Swingle, (1892)
Aecidium kakelense Henn. 1903
Aecidium kraussiae P. Syd. & Syd. 1923
Aecidium lebeckiae Henn. 1898
Aecidium leguminosarum Rabenh. (sic) probably Opiz 1836, accepted as Uromyces viciae-fabae (Pers.) J. Schröt., (1875)
Aecidium leiocarpum Syd. & P. Syd. 1917
Aecidium leonotidis Henn. 1895 accepted as Puccinia leonotidis (Henn.) Arthur,(1921)
Aecidium litakunense Doidge 1939
Aecidium longaense Henn. 1903
Aecidium loranthi Cooke 1885
Aecidium macarangae P.Henn.*
Aecidium macowanianum Thüm. 1875
Aecidium macowanianum f. conyzae-pinnatilobatae Thüm. 1875 accepted as Endophyllum macowanianum (Thüm.) Pole-Evans, (1907)
Aecidium menthae DC., (1815), accepted as Puccinia menthae Pers. (1801) 
Aecidium menyharthi Henn. 1906
Aecidium metalasiae Syd. & P. Syd. 1912, accepted as Endophyllum metalasiae (Syd. & P. Syd.) A.R. Wood & Berndt, (2012)
Aecidium moggii Doidge 1939
Aecidium myrsiphylli Kalchbr. 1882
Aecidium nestlerae Doidge 1948
Aecidium nidorellae Doidge 1927
Aecidium ornamentale Kalchbr. 1875 accepted as Ravenelia ornamentalis (Kalchbr.) Dietel, (1906)
Aecidium ornithogaleum Bubák 1905, accepted as Puccinia hordei G.H.Otth (1871)[1870]
Aecidium ornithogali Kalchbr. (sic) possibly *Aecidium ornithogaleum Bubák 1905,
Aecidium osteospermi Doidge 1927 accepted as Endophyllum osteospermi (Doidge) A.R. Wood, (1998)
Aecidium osyridicarpi Massee 1911 accepted as Puccinia osyridicarpi (Massee) Grove [as osyridocarpi], (1916)
Aecidium oxalidis Thüm. 1876 accepted as Puccinia sorghi Schwein., (1832) [1834]
Aecidium pachystigmae Doidge 1927,
Aecidium pelargonii Thüm. 1877, accepted as Puccinia pelargonii (Thüm.) P. Syd. & Syd., (1904)
Aecidium pentziae-globosae Doidge 1948
Aecidium permultum Syd. & P. Syd. 1912
Aecidium pienarii Doidge (1927)
Aecidium plectranthi  Barclay 1890 accepted as Coleosporium plectranthi (Barclay) Sacc., (1891)
Aecidium plectroniae Cooke 1882
Aecidium plectroniicola Henn. 1903
Aecidium pottsii Doidge 1927
Aecidium pretoriense Doidge 1927
Aecidium pychnostachydis Syd. (sic) possibly Aecidium pycnostachydis (Kalchbr.) Doidge 1927, 
Aecidium rafniae  MacOwan
Aecidium ranunculacearum  DC. 1815, accepted as Uromyces dactylidis G.H. Otth, (1861)
Aecidium relhaniae Dippen. 1931
Aecidium resinaecola  (F. Rudolphi) G. Winter 1884 recorded as Aecidium resinicolum
Aecidium resinaecola var. tumefaciens G. Winter 1884 recorded as Aecidium resinicolum var. tumefaciens 
Aecidium rhamni Pers. (sic) may be Aecidium rhamni J.F. Gmel. (1792), accepted as Puccinia coronata Corda (1837)
Aecidium rhamni f. Rhamni prinoides Thuem.*
Aecidium rhynchosiae Cooke 1882 accepted as Synchytrium dolichi (Cooke) Gäum., (1927)
Aecidium royenae Cooke & Massee 1889
Aecidium rubellum Pers. ex J.F. Gmel. 1792 accepted as Puccinia phragmitis (Schumach.) Tul., (1854)
Aecidium rumicis f. Rumicis eckloniana Thuem.*
Aecidium schlechterianum Henn. 1898
Aecidium senecionis Desm. 1836
Aecidium senecionis f. Senecionis mikanoides Thuem.*
Aecidium senecionis f. Senecionis napifolii Thuem.*
Aecidium senecionis f. Senecionis quinquelobi Thuem.*
Aecidium senecionum Desm.*
Aecidium serrae Syd. & P. Syd. 1912
Aecidium spinicolum (sic)  Doidge Aecidium spinicola Doidge [as 'spinicolum'], (1948)
Aecidium stobaeae (sic) Kalchbr. & Cooke 1879 Puccinia stobaeae MacOwan [as 'stobeae'], (1882)
Aecidium talinophilum P. Syd. & Syd. 1923
Aecidium tetragonii (sic) Doidge Aecidium tetragoniae Doidge, (1939)
Aecidium thunbergiae Cooke 1882 accepted as Puccinia thunbergiae Cooke, (1882)
Aecidium tinneae  Henn. 1903
Aecidium transvaaliae Henn. & Pole-Evans 1908
Aecidium truncatum Kalchbr.
Aecidium tubulosum Pat. & Gaillard 1889
Aecidium tylophorae Cooke 1890
Aecidium uleanum Pazschke 1892
Aecidium urgineae Henn. & Pole-Evans 1908
Aecidium urtica Schw. (sic) possibly one of: Aecidium urticae Schumach. 1803, acceprted as Puccinia urticata; Aecidium urticae DC. 1815; or Aecidium urticae Sawada 1944;
Aecidium vangueriae  Cooke 1882
Aecidium vernoniae-monocephalae Doidge 1927
Aecidium vernoniae-podocomae Doidge 1927
Aecidium viborgiae (sic) P.Henn. Aecidium wiborgiae Henn. [as 'viborgiae'], (1898)
Aecidium vignae Cooke
Aecidium vitis A.L.Sm.
Aecidium welwitschii Lagerh.
Aecidium wiborgiae Henn. (1898) recorded as viborgiae
Aecidium withaniae Thüm. 1877
Aecidium woodianum  Doidge 1927
Aecidium sp.

Genus: Aegerita Pers. 1794,
Aegerita penniseti Henn., (1904), accepted as Beniowskia sphaeroidea (Kalchbr. & Cooke) E.W. Mason, (1928)

Ag
 
Family: Agaricaceae Chevall. 1826

Genus: Agaricus L. 1753
Agaricus (Amanita) muscarius Linn, ex Fr. L. 1753, accepted as Amanita muscaria (L.) Lam., (1783)
Agaricus (Amanita) praetorius Fr. 1838 basionym Agaricus praetorius Fr., (1838)
Agaricus campestris L. 1753
Agaricus comtulus Fr. 1838
Agaricus dialeri (Bres. & Torrend) Sacc. & Trotter 1912 accepted as Leucoagaricus dialeri (Bres. & Torrend) D.A. Reid, (1975)
Agaricus (Clitocybe) amarus (Alb. & Schwein.) Fr. 1821 accepted as Lepista amara (Alb. & Schwein.) Maire, (1930)
Agaricus (Clitocybe) expallens Pers. 1801 accepted as Pseudoclitocybe expallens (Pers.) M.M. Moser,  (1967)
Agaricus (Clitocybe) fragrans Sow. ex Fr. (sic) Fr. 1815?
Agaricus (Clitocybe) gentianeus Quel*
Agaricus (Clitocybe) laccata (sic) Scop, ex Fr. probably Agaricus laccatus Scop., (1772)
Agaricus (Clitocybe) membranaceus Fr. (sic) possibly one of; Agaricus membranaceus Hoffm. 1787; Agaricus membranaceus Scop. 1788, accepted as Homophron cernuum; Agaricus membranaceus Bolton 1788; Agaricus membranaceus Vahl 1790,  accepted as Infundibulicybe gibba; Agaricus membranaceus Cooke & Massee 1892, accepted as Lepiota membranacea
Agaricus (Clitocybe) sinopicus Fr. 1818 accepted as Bonomyces sinopicus (Fr.) Vizzini, (2014)
Agaricus (Clitocybe) splendens Pers. 1801accepted as Paralepista splendens (Pers.) Vizzini, (2012)
Agaricus (Clitocybe) trullaeformis Fr. Agaricus trulliformis Fr. [as 'trullaeformis'], (1821) accepted as Infundibulicybe trulliformis (Fr.) Gminder, (2016)
Agaricus (Clitocybe) zizyphinus(sic) Vivian Agaricus ziziphina Viv., (1834) syn. Clitocybe ziziphina (Viv.) Sacc., (1887)
Agaricus (Collybia) acervatus Fr. 1821accepted as Connopus acervatus (Fr.) K.W. Hughes, Mather & R.H. Petersen 2010
Agaricus (Collybia) alveolatus Kalchbr. 1881accepted as Hymenopellis alveolata (Kalchbr.) R.H. Petersen [as alveolatus], (2010)
Agaricus (Collybia) butyraceus Bull. 1792accepted as Rhodocollybia butyracea (Bull.) Lennox,  (1979)
Agaricus (Collybia) chortophilus Berk. 1843 accepted as Neoclitocybe chortophila (Berk.) D.A. Reid, (1975)
Agaricus (Collybia) confluens Pers. 1796 accepted as Collybiopsis confluens (Pers.) R.H. Petersen,(2021)
Agaricus (Collybia) dryophilus Bull. 1790 accepted as Gymnopus dryophilus (Bull.) Murrill, N.  (1916)
Agaricus (Collybia) extuberans Fr. 1838 accepted as Gymnopus ocior (Pers.) Antonín & Noordel., (1997)
Agaricus (Collybia) homotrichus Berk. (sic) possibly Agaricus hemitrichus Pers. 1801, accepted as  Cortinarius hemitrichus (Pers.) Fr., (1838)
Agaricus (Collybia) macilentus Fr. 1821 accepted as Agaricus macilentus Fr., (1821)
Agaricus (Collybia) melinosarcus Kalchbr. 1876 accepted as Agaricus melinosarcus Kalchbr., 1876)
Agaricus (Collybia) radicatus Relhan 1786 accepted as Hymenopellis radicata (Relhan) R.H. Petersen,  (2010)
Agaricus (Collybia) radicatus var. brachypus Kalchbr. 1881 accepted as Hymenopellis radicata (Relhan) R.H. Petersen, (2010)
Agaricus (Collybia) stridulus Fr. 1870 accepted as Melanoleuca stridula (Fr.) Singer, (1943)
Agaricus (Collybia) velutipes Fr. (sic) possibly Curtis 1782, accepted as Flammulina velutipes (Curtis) Singer, (1951) [1949]
Agaricus (Coprinus) ephemerus Bull. 1786 accepted as Coprinellus ephemerus (Bull.) Redhead, Vilgalys & Moncalvo, (2001)
Agaricus (Crepidotus) applanatus Pers. 1796 accepted as Crepidotus applanatus (Pers.) P. Kumm., (1871)
Agaricus (Crepidotus) episphaeria Berk. 1846 accepted as Agaricus episphaeria Berk. 1846
Agaricus (Crepidotus) inandae Cooke 1890 accepted as Agaricus inandae Cooke 1890
Agaricus (Crepidotus) pogonatus Kalchbr. 1881 accepted as Agaricus pogonatus Kalchbr. 1881
Agaricus (Crepidotus) proteus Kalchbr. 1876 accepted as Melanotus proteus (Sacc.) Singer, (1946)
Agaricus (Crepidotus) scalaris  var. lobulatus Kalchbr. 1881 Agaricus scalaris var. lobulatus Kalchbr., (1881)
Agaricus cretaceus Fr. (sic)*
Agaricus (Entoloma) sagittaeformis Kalchbr. & Cooke (Agaricus sagittiformis Kalchbr. & Cooke [as sagittaeformis], (1881) accepted as Termitomyces sagittiformis (Kalchbr. & Cooke) D.A. Reid [as sagittaeformis], (1975)
Agaricus (Flammula) alnicola Fr. 1821 accepted as Flammula alnicola (Fr.) P. Kumm., (1871)
Agaricus (Flammula) flavidus Schaeff. 1774 accepted as Pholiota flavida (Schaeff.) Singer, (1951) [1949]
Agaricus (Flammula) harmoge Fr. 1838 accepted as Agaricus harmoge Fr. 1838
Agaricus (Flammula) janus Berk. & Br. accepted as Agaricus janus Berk. & Broome 1871
Agaricus (Flammula) tilopus Kalchbr. & MacOwan 1881accepted as Pholiota tilopus (Kalchbr. & MacOwan) D.A. Reid, (1975)
Agaricus (Galera) eatoni Berk. 1876accepted as Agaricus eatonii Berk. 1876
Agaricus (Galera) hypnorum Schrank 1789 accepted as Galerina hypnorum (Schrank) Kühner, (1935)
Agaricus (Galera) peroxydatus Berk. 1843 accepted as Conocybe peroxydata (Berk.) D.A. Reid,  (1975)
Agaricus (Galera) tener Schaeff. 1774 accepted as Conocybe tenera (Schaeff.) Kühner, (1935)
Agaricus (Hebeloma) spoliatus  Fr. 1838 accepted as Hebeloma spoliatum (Fr.) Gillet, [1878]
Agaricus (Hypholoma) candolleanus Fr. 1818 accepted as Psathyrella candolleana (Fr.) Maire, (1937)
Agaricus (Hypholoma) capnolepis Kalchbr. 1881 accepted as Agaricus capnolepis Kalchbr., (1881)
Agaricus (Hypholoma) fascicularis Huds. 1778 accepted as Hypholoma fasciculare (Huds.) P. Kumm.,  (1871)
Agaricus (Lepiota) africamus Kalchbr. (sic) possibly Agaricus africanus (Fayod) Sacc. 1895
Agaricus (Lepiota) atricapillus Cooke & Massee 1888 accepted as Agaricus atricapillus Cooke & Massee 1888 
Agaricus (Lepiota) cuculliformis Fr. 1849 accepted as Agaricus cuculliformis Fr. 1849
Agaricus (Lepiota) excoriatus Schaeff. 1774 accepted as Macrolepiota excoriata (Schaeff.) Wasser, (1978)
Agaricus (Lepiota) kunzei Fr. 1849 accepted as Agaricus kunzei Fr., (1849) [1848]
Agaricus (Lepiota) magnannulatus Kalchbr. 1881 accepted as Agaricus magnannulatus Kalchbr. 1881
Agaricus (Lepiota) montagnei Kalchbr. 1881 accepted as Agaricus montagnei Kalchbr. 1881
Agaricus (Lepiota) polysarcos Kalchbr. & MacOwan (1881)accepted as Agaricus polysarcos Kalchbr. & MacOwan, (1881)
Agaricus (Lepiota) procerus Scop, 1772 accepted as Agaricus procerus Scop., (1772)
Agaricus (Lepiota) pteropus Kalchbr. & MacOwan 1880 accepted as Agaricus pleropus Kalchbr. & MacOwan [as pteropus], (1880)
Agaricus (Lepiota) rubricatus  Berk. & Br. 1871 accepted as Agaricus rubricatus Berk. & Broome, (1871)
Agaricus (Lepiota) sulfurellus Kalchbr. & MacOwan accepted as Agaricus sulfurellus Kalchbr. 1879
Agaricus (Lepiota) various Kalchbr. & MacOwan. (sic) possibly one of: Agaricus varius Schaeff.,  (1774) accepted as Cortinarius varius (Schaeff.) Fr., (1838) [1836-1838] or Agaricus varius Bolton,(1788) accepted as Panaeolus fimicola (Pers.) Gillet, (1878)
Agaricus (Lepiota) zeyheri Berk. 1843 accepted as Leucocoprinus zeyheri (Berk.) Singer, (1943)
Agaricus (Lepiota) zeyheri var. telosus Kalchbr. & MacOwan 1881
Agaricus (Lepiota) zeyheri var. verrucellosus Kalchbr. (sic) possibly Miq. ex Kalchbr. 1881
Agaricus muscarius Linn. 1753 accepted as Amanita muscaria (L.) Lam., (1783)
Agaricus (Mycena) actiniceps Kalchbr. & Cooke 1881 accepted as Marasmius actiniceps (Kalchbr. & Cooke) D.A. Reid, (1975) 
Agaricus (Mycena) argutus Kalchbr. 1881  Agaricus argutus Kalchbr., (1881)
Agaricus (Mycena) capillaris  Schumach. 1803 accepted as Mycena capillaris (Schumach.) P. Kumm., (1871)
Agaricus (Mycena) clavicularis Fr. 1821 accepted as Mycena clavicularis (Fr.) Gillet, (1876) [1878]
Agaricus (Mycena) corticola Fr. 1821 accepted as Mycena clavicularis (Fr.) Gillet, (1876) [1878]
Agaricus (Mycena) debilis Fr. 1838 Agaricus debilis Fr. 1838
Agaricus (Mycena) dilatatus Fr. 1815 accepted as Mycena stylobates (Pers.) P. Kumm., (1871)
Agaricus (Mycena) dregeanus Lév. 1846 Agaricus dregeanus Lév. 1846
Agaricus (Mycena) galeropsis Fr. 1877 Agaricus galeropsis Fr. 1877 
Agaricus (Mycena) heliscus Berk. & Broome 1871 accepted as Gloiocephala helisca (Berk. & Broome) Pegler, (1986)
Agaricus (Mycena) hiemalis Osbeck 1788 accepted as Phloeomana hiemalis (Osbeck) Redhead, (2016)
Agaricus (Mycena) macrorrhizus Fr. 1848 Agaricus macrorrhizus Fr. 1848
Agaricus (Mycena) rhodiophyllus Kalchbr. 1881 Agaricus rhodiophyllus Kalchbr. 1881
Agaricus (Mycena) sciolus Kalchbr. 1881 Agaricus sciolus Kalchbr. 1881
Agaricus (Mycena) tintinnabulum (Paulet) Fr. 1838 Agaricus tintinnabulum (Paulet) Fr. 1838
Agaricus (Mycena) vitreus Fr. 1821 Mycena vitrea (Fr.) Quél., (1872)
Agaricus (Naucoria) arenicola Berk. 1843 accepted as Agrocybe pediades (Fr.) Fayod, (1889)
Agaricus (Naucoria) furfuraceus Pers. 1801 accepted as Tubaria furfuracea (Pers.) Gillet, (1876) [1878]
Agaricus (Naucoria) pediades Fr. 1821 accepted as Agrocybe pediades (Fr.) Fayod, (1889)
Agaricus (Naucoria) pygmaeus Bull. 1791 accepted as Psathyrella pygmaea (Bull.) Singer, (1951) [1949]
Agaricus (Naucoria) semiorbicularis Bull. 1789 accepted as Agrocybe pediades (Fr.) Fayod, (1889)
Agaricus (Naucoria) undulosus Jungh. (sic) possibly Agaricus undulosus Fr., (1838) [1836-1838]
Agaricus (Nolanea) castus MacOwan 1881 accepted as Mycena casta (MacOwan) D.A. Reid, (1975)
Agaricus (Omphalia) griseo-pallidus Desm. (1826) accepted as Arrhenia griseopallida (Desm.) Watling, (1989) [1988]
Agaricus (Omphalia) integrellus Pers. 1800 accepted as Delicatula integrella (Pers.) Fayod, (1889)
Agaricus (Omphalia) linopus Kalchbr. 1881 accepted as Agaricus linopus Kalchbr., (1881)
Agaricus (Omphalia) micromeles Berk. & Broome 1871 accepted as Agaricus micromeles Berk. & Broome, (1871)
Agaricus (Omphalia) paurophyllus Berk. 1876 accepted as Agaricus paurophyllus Berk., (1876)
Agaricus (Omphalia) polypus Kalchbr. 1877 accepted as Marasmius polypus (Kalchbr.) D.A. Reid, (1975)
Agaricus (Omphalia) rusticus Fr. 1838 accepted as Arrhenia rustica (Fr.) Redhead, Lutzoni, Moncalvo & Vilgalys, (2002)
Agaricus (Omphalia) scyphiformis Fr. 1818 accepted as Agaricus scyphiformis Fr., (1818)
Agaricus (Omphalia) scyphoides Fr. 1821 accepted as Clitopilus scyphoides (Fr.) Singer, (1946)
Agaricus (Omphalia) syndesmius Kalchbr. 1881 accepted as Agaricus syndesmius Kalchbr., (1881)
Agaricus (Omphalia) umbelliferus Linn, ex Fr. var. cinnabarinus Berk.(sic) possibly Agaricus umbellifer L., (1753) (Checked to here on Index Fungorum) 
Agaricus (Panaeolus) caliginosus Jungh. 1830 accepted as Agaricus caliginosus Jungh., (1830)
Agaricus (Panaeolus) campanulatis L. 1753 accepted as Panaeolus papilionaceus (Bull.) Quél., (1872)
Agaricus (Panaeolus) fimicolus  (sic) Fr. accepted as Agaricus fimicola Fr., (1821)
Agaricus (Panaeolus) papilionaceus Bull. 1781 accepted as Panaeolus papilionaceus (Bull.) Quél.,  (1872)
Agaricus (Panaeolus) separatum Linn, ex Fr. Agaricus separatus L. 1753 accepted as Panaeolus semiovatus (Sowerby) S. Lundell & Nannf. (1938)
Agaricus (Pholiota) aurivellus Batsch ex Fr.*
Agaricus (Pholiota) mycenoides Fr.*
Agaricus (Pholiota) spectabilis Fr. (sic) possibly Weinm. 1824, accepted as Gymnopilus junonius (Fr.) P.D. Orton, (1960)
Agaricus (Pholiota) togularis Bull, 1793 accepted as Agrocybe praecox (Pers.) Fayod, (1889)
Agaricus (Pholiota) unicolor Vahl 1792 accepted as  Galerina marginata (Batsch) Kühner, (1935)
Agaricus (Pleurotus) atrocaeruleus Fr. accepted as Agaricus atrocoeruleus Fr. [as atrocœruleus], (1815), accepted as Hohenbuehelia atrocoerulea (Fr.) Singer [as atrocaerulea], (1951) [1949]
Agaricus (Pleurotus) aureo-tomentosus Kalchbr. Agaricus aureotomentosus Kalchbr. [as aureo-tomentosus], (1880)
Agaricus (Pleurotus) caveatus Berk. & M.A. Curtis 1868, accepted as Crepidotus caveatus (Berk. & M.A. Curtis) Murrill, (1916)
Agaricus (Pleurotus) clusilis Kalchbr. 1880 accepted as Marasmiellus clusilis (Sacc.) D.A. Reid,  (1975)
Agaricus (Pleurotus) contrarius Kalchbr. 1881 accepted as Marasmiellus contrarius (Sacc.) D.A. Reid, (1975)
Agaricus (Pleurotus) flahellatus Berk. & Broome 1871, accepted as Pleurotus flabellatus Sacc., (1887)
Agaricus (Pleurotus) gilvescens  Kalchbr. 1881 accepted as Agaricus gilvescens  Kalchbr. 1881
Agaricus (Pleurotus) limpidus Fr. 1838 accepted as Agaricus limpidus Fr., (1838) [1836-1838]
Agaricus (Pleurotus) olearius DC. 1815 accepted as Omphalotus olearius (DC.) Singer, (1948) [1946] 
Agaricus (Pleurotus) perpusillus Fr. (sic) possibly Agaricus perpusillus Lumn. 1791
Agaricus (Pleurotus) radiatim-plicatus Kalchbr. 1881 accepted as Marasmiellus radiatim-plicatus (Kalchbr.) D.A. Reid, (1975)
Agaricus (Pleurotus) sciadeum (sic) Kalchbr. & MacOwan 1881 Agaricus sciadeum Kalchbr. & MacOwan 1881, accepted as Hohenbuehelia sciadium (Kalchbr. & MacOwan) Singer [as sciadea], (1951) [1949]
Agaricus (Pleurotus) sciadeum (sic) var. salmoneus Kalchbr. & MacOwan, (1881) accepted as Phyllotopsis salmonea (Kalchbr. & MacOwan) D.A. Reid [as Phylotopis salmoneus], (1975)
Agaricus (Pleurotus) septicus Fr. 1821 accepted as Agaricus septicus Fr., (1821)
Agaricus (Pleurotus) striatulus Fr. (sic) nay be one of: Agaricus striatulus J.F. Gmel. 1792, accepted as Gloeophyllum striatum (Fr.) Murrill, Bull. (1905); Agaricus striatulus Pers. 1801, accepted as Resupinatus striatulus (Pers.) Murrill, (1915) or Agaricus striatulus Schumach. 1803
Agaricus (Pluteus) cervinus Schaeff. 1774 accepted as Pluteus cervinus (Schaeff.) P. Kumm., (1871)
Agaricus (Psalliota) arvensis Schaeff. 1774 accepted as Agaricus arvensis Schaeff., (1774)
Agaricus (Psalliota) arvensis var. grossus Berk.*
Agaricus (Psalliota) campestris L. 1753 accepted as Agaricus campestris L. [as campester], (1753)
Agaricus (Psalliota) campestris (b) praticola. probably Agaricus campestris var. praticola Vittad. ex Fr. 1838, accepted as Agaricus campestris L. [as campester], (1753)
Agaricus (Psalliota) pratensis var. australis Berk. 1843 accepted as Cuphophyllus pratensis(Pers.) Bon, (1985) [1984]
Agaricus (Psalliota) sylvaticus Schaeff. 1774 accepted as Agaricus sylvaticus Schaeff., (1774) 
Agaricus (Psathyra) corrugis Pers. 1794 accepted as Psathyrella corrugis (Pers.) Konrad & Maubl., (1949) [1948]
Agaricus (Psathyra) spadiceo-griseus Schaeff. 1774 accepted as Psathyrella spadiceogrisea (Schaeff.) Maire, (1937)
Agaricus (Psathyrella) disseminatus Pers. 1801 accepted as Coprinellus disseminatus (Pers.) J.E. Lange [as disseminata], (1938) 
Agaricus (Psathyrella) gracilis Fr. 1821, accepted as Psathyrella corrugis (Pers.) Konrad & Maubl., (1949) [1948]
Agaricus (Psathyrella) pronus Fr. 1838 accepted as Psathyrella prona (Fr.) Gillet, (1878)
Agaricus (Psathyrella) subtilis Fr. 1821 accepted as Agaricus subtilis Fr., (1821)
Agaricus (Psathyrella) sp.
Agaricus (Psilocybe) atrorufus Schaeff. 1774 accepted as Deconica montana (Pers.) P.D. Orton, (1960)
Agaricus (Psilocybe) atrorufus var. montanus Pers. ex Fr.*
Agaricus (Psilocybe) ericaeus Pers. 1801 accepted as Hypholoma ericaeum (Pers.) Kühner, Bull. (1936)
Agaricus (Psilocybe) foenisecii Pers. 1800 accepted as Panaeolina foenisecii (Pers.) Maire, (1933)
Agaricus (Psilocybe) semilanceatus  Fr. 1818 accepted as Psilocybe semilanceata (Fr.) P. Kumm., (1871)
Agaricus (Psilocybe) squalens Fr. 1838 accepted as Agaricus squalens Fr.,(1838) [1836-1838]
Agaricus (Psilocybe) taediosus Kalchbr. 1880 accepted as Stropharia taediosa (Kalchbr.) D.A. Reid, (1975)
Agaricus (Psilocybe) udus Pers. 1801 accepted as Bogbodia uda (Pers.) Redhead, (2013)
Agaricus purpuratus Kalchbr. var. cinerea possibly Agaricus purpuratus Cooke & Massee 1890
Agaricus (Schulzeria) umkowaani Cooke & Massee, 1889 accepted as Termitomyces umkowaan (Cooke & Massee) D.A. Reid [as umkowaani], (1975)
Agaricus (Stropharia) melaspermus Bull, ex Fr. (sic) possibly Agaricus melaspermus Fr., (1838) [1836-1838]
Agaricus (Stropharia) obturatus Fr. 1821 accepted as Psilocybe coronilla (Bull.) Noordel., (1995)
Agaricus (Stropharia) olivaceo-flava Kalchbr. & MacOwan accepted as Agaricus olivaceoflavus Kalchbr. & MacOwan [as olivaceo-flavus], (1881)
Agaricus (Stropharia) semiglobatus Batsch 1786 accepted as Protostropharia semiglobata (Batsch) Redhead, Moncalvo & Vilgalys, (2013)
Agaricus (Tricholoma) caffrorum Kalchbr. & MacOwan 1881 accepted as Lepista caffrorum (Kalchbr. & MacOwan) Singer, (1951) [1949]
Agaricus (Tricholoma) caffrorum var. sulonensis Kalchbr. & MacOwan 1881 accepted as Lepista caffrorum (Kalchbr. & MacOwan) Singer, (1951) [1949]
Agaricus (Tricholoma) georgii Clus. ex Fr. possibly L. 1753, accepted as Calocybe gambosa (Fr.) Donk, (1962)
Agaricus (Tricholoma) melaleucus var. porphyroleucus (Bull.) Fr. 1821 accepted as Melanoleuca polioleuca (Fr.) Kühner & Maire, Bull. (1934)
Agaricus (Tricholoma) ustalis Fr. 1818 accepted as Tricholoma ustale (Fr.) P. Kumm., (1871)
Agaricus (Volvaria) bombycinus Schaeff. 1774 accepted as Volvariella bombycina (Schaeff.) Singer, (1951) [1949]

Ai

Genus: Aithaloderma Syd. & P. Syd. 1913
Aithaloderma capense [as capensis] Doidge 1927 accepted as Chaetothyrium capense (Doidge) Hansf. (1950)

Al

Genus: Alectoria Ach. 1809?(lichens) 
Alectoria chalybeiformis (L.) Röhl. 1813 f. terrestris Stizenb. 1890
Alectoria jubata (L.) Ach. 1810
Alectoria usneoides (Ach.) Ach. 1810 accepted as Ramalina usnea (L.) R. Howe, (1914)

Genus: Aleurodiscus 
Aleurodiscus acerinus (Pers.) Höhn. & Litsch. 1907 accepted as Dendrothele acerina (Pers.) P.A. Lemke, (1965)
Aleurodiscus acerinus var. longisporus  Höhn. & Litsch. 1907 accepted as Dendrothele acerina (Pers.) P.A. Lemke, (1965)
Aleurodiscus capensis Lloyd 1920 accepted as Aleurocystis capensis (Lloyd) Lloyd,(1920) [1921]
Aleurodiscus cerussatus [as cerrussatus] (Bres.) Höhn. & Litsch. 1907 
Aleurodiscus corneus Lloyd 1920,
Aleurodiscus disciformis (DC.) Pat. 1894

Genus: Allantonectria  Earle 1901, accepted as Thyronectria Sacc., (1875), Sordariomycetes
Allantonectria miltina  (Durieu & Mont.) Weese 1910

Genus: Allarthothelium (Vain.) Zahlbr. 1908, accepted as Arthonia Ach., (1806) (Ramalinaceae C. Agardh [as 'Ramalineae'], (1821)
Allarthothelium minimum Vain. 1926, accepted as Bilimbia minima (Vain.) Räsänen, (1943)

Genus: Allomyces E.J. Butler 1911
Allomyces arbusculus E.J. Butler 1911

Genus: Aloysiella Mattir. & Sacc. 1908, accepted as Metacapnodium Speg., (1918)
Aloysiella ruwenzorensis Mattir. & Sacc. 1908

Genus: Alternaria Nees 1816
Alternaria allii Nolla. (1927), accepted as Alternaria solani Sorauer, (1896)
Alternaria brassicae (Berk.) Sacc. 1880
Alternaria brassicae f. phaseoli [as var. phaseoli] Brunaud 1894  accepted as Alternaria brassicae (Berk.) Sacc., (1880)
Alternaria circinans (Berk. & M.A. Curtis) P.C. Bolle 1924 accepted as Alternaria brassicicola (Schwein.) Wiltshire, (1947)
Alternaria citri Ellis & N. Pierce 1902 
Alternaria crassa (Sacc.) Rands (1917) 
Alternaria cucumerina (Ellis & Everh.) J.A. Elliott 1917
Alternaria dianthi F. Stevens & J.G. Hall 1909
Alternaria gossypina (Thüm.) J.C.F. Hopkins 1931
Alternaria herculea (Ellis & G. Martin) J.A. Elliott (1917),accepted as Alternaria brassicae (Berk.) Sacc., (1880)
Alternaria longipes Tisd. & Wadk (sic) possibly (Ellis & Everh.) E.W. Mason 1928,
Alternaria macrospora Zimm. (1904),
Alternaria macrospora (group) possibly accepted as Alternaria brassicae (Berk.) Sacc. (1880)
Alternaria solani (Ellis & G. Martin) L.R. Jones & Grout 1896
Alternaria solani (group)
Alternaria tabacina (Ellis & Everh.) Hori (1903)
Alternaria tenuis Nees (1817), accepted as Alternaria alternata (Fr.) Keissl. (1912)
Alternaria violae L.D. Galloway & Dorsett 1900 
Alternaria sp.

Am

Genus: Amanita 
Amanita mappa Quel. (sic) possibly (Batsch) Bertill. 1866, accepted as Amanita citrina Pers., Tent. (1797)
Amanita muscaria S.F.Gray (sic) possibly (L.) Lam., (1783)
Amanita pantherina Quel (sic) possibly (DC.) Krombh. 1846
Amanita phalloides Secr. 1833
Amanita rubescens (Pers. ex Fr.) Gray (1797) possibly Pers. 1797
Amanita solitaria Secr (sic)

Genus: Amanitopsis Roze accepted as Amanita Pers. (1794)
Amanitopsis praetoria (Fr.) Sacc. 1887 basionym Agaricus praetorius Fr. 1838

Family: Amaurochaetaceae Rostaf. ex Cooke 1877

Genus: Amaurochaete Rostaf. 1873
Amaurochaete fuliginosa (Sowerby) T. Macbr. 1899,

Genus: Amauroderma Murrill, (1905)
Amauroderma argenteofulvum (Van der Byl) Doidge 1950
Amauroderma fuscoporia Wakef. 1948 accepted as Amauroderma fuscoporium Wakef. [as 'fuscoporia'], (1948)
Amauroderma rugosum  Lloyd (sic) possibly (Blume & T. Nees) Torrend 1920, accepted as Sanguinoderma rugosum (Blume & T. Nees) Y.F. Sun, D.H. Costa & B.K. Cui, (2020)

Genus: Amazonia Theiss. 1913
Amazonia asterinoides (G. Winter) Theiss. 1913,
Amazonia goniomae Doidge 1924

Genus: Amphiloma Nyl. (1855), accepted as Lepraria Ach. (1803)
Amphiloma elegans (Link) Körb. 1855 accepted as Xanthoria elegans (Link) Th. Fr., (1860)
Amphiloma elegantissimum (Nyl.) Müll. Arg. 1888, accepted as Stellarangia elegantissima (Nyl.) Frödén, Arup & Søchting, (2013)
Amphiloma eudoxum Müll. Arg. 1888, accepted as Teloschistopsis eudoxa (Müll. Arg.) Frödén, Arup & Søchting, (2013)
Amphiloma leucoxanthum Müll. Arg. 1888

An

Genus: Anaptychia Körb. 1848
Anaptychia corallophora  Wain. (sic) probably Anaptychia coralliphora (Taylor) Zahlbr. [as 'corallophora'], (1931), accepted as Polyblastidium corallophorum (Taylor) Kalb, (2015)
Anaptychia dactyliza (Nyl.) Zahlbr. 1924
Anaptychia granulifera (Ach.) A. Massal. 1853
Anaptychia hypoleuca (Ach.) A. Massal. 1860, accepted as Polyblastidium hypoleucum (Ach.) Kalb, (2015)
Anaptychia hypoleuca var. colorata Zahlbr. 1927
Anaptychia leucomela Massal. Anaptychia leucomelos (L.) A. Massal. [as 'leucomela'], (1890) accepted as Leucodermia leucomelos (L.) Kalb, (2015)
Anaptychia leucomelaena Vain.*
Anaptychia leucomelaena var. angustifolia Müll.Arg. possibly Anaptychia leucomelos var. angustifolia (Meyen & Flot.) Müll. Arg., (1894) accepted as 
Anaptychia leucomelaena var. multifida f. squarrosa Vain. possibly Anaptychia leucomelos f. squarrosa Vain. [as Anaptychia leucomelaena f. squarrosa], (1901) or Anaptychia leucomelos var. multifida (Meyen & Flot.) Vain., (1890)
Anaptychia obesa f. caesiocrocata (Nyl.) Zahlbr. 1931
Anaptychia palpebrata (Taylor) Vain. 1898
Anaptychia podocarpa (Bél.) A. Massal. 1860 accepted as Heterodermia podocarpa (Bél.) D.D. Awasthi, (1973)
Anaptychia speciosa (Wulfen) A. Massal. 1853 accepted as Heterodermia speciosa (Wulfen) Trevis.,  (1868)
Anaptychia speciosa f. sorediosa (Müll. Arg.) Zahlbr. 1931
Anaptychia speciosa var. esorediata Vain. 1901
Anaptychia speciosa var. lobulifera Vain. 1901

Genus: Anelleria 
Anelleria separata Karst.*

Genus: Angelina Fr. 1849
Angelina nigrocinnabarina (Schwein.) Berk. & M.A. Curtis 1868 accepted as Blitridium nigrocinnabarinum (Schwein.) Sacc., (1889)

Genus: Antennaria Link 1809
Antennaria (Goleroa) engleriana v.Hohn.*

Genus: Anthostomella Sacc. 1875
Anthostomella africana Berl. & Vogl. (sic) possibly (Kalchbr. & Cooke) Sacc. 1882
Anthostomella capensis Doidge 1948
Anthostomella cassinopsidis Rehm 1906
Anthostomella cassinopsidis (Kalchbr. & Cooke) Petr. & Syd. 1925
Anthostomella nigroannulata Sacc. 1882
Anthostomella salaciae Doidge 1948

Genus: Anthracophyllum Ces. 1879
Anthracophyllum nigritum (Lév.) Kalchbr., (1881)as Anthracophyllum nigrita

Genus: Anthracothecium Hampe ex A. Massal. 1860
Anthracothecium biferum  Zahlbr. 1932
Anthracothecium duplicans (Nyl.) Müll. Arg. 1880 accepted as Pyrenula duplicans (Nyl.) Aptroot, (2008)
Anthracothecium pyrenuloides (Mont.) Müll. Arg. 1880 accepted as Pyrenula pyrenuloides (Mont.) R.C. Harris, (1989), 
Anthracothecium thelomorphum (Tuck.) Zahlbr. (1922) [as thelemorphum]
Anthracothecium thwaitesii(Leight.) Müll. Arg. 1880
Anthracothecium variolosum (Pers.) Müll. Arg. 1880

Genus: Anthurus Kalchbr. & MacOwan 1880
Anthurus archeri (Berk.) E.Fisch.,(1886) accepted as Clathrus archeri (Berk.) Dring 1980
Anthurus macowani Marloth 1913
Anthurus woodii MacOwan 1880

Ap

Genus: Aphysa Theiss. & Syd. 1917, accepted as Coleroa Rabenh., (1850)
Aphysa lebeckiae  (Verwoerd & Dippen.) Doidge 1942,  accepted as Coleroa lebeckiae (Verwoerd & Dippen.) Arx, (1962)
Aphysa rhynchosiae (Kalchbr. & Cooke) Theiss. & Syd. 1917, accepted as Coleroa rhynchosiae (Kalchbr. & Cooke) E. Müll., (1962)
Aphysa senniana (Sacc.) Doidge 1941, accepted as Coleroa senniana (Sacc.) Arx, (1962)

Genus: Appendiculella  Höhn. 1919
Appendiculella calostroma (Desm.) Höhn. 1919

Ar

Family: Arachniaceae Coker & Couch 1928

Genus: Arachnion Schwein. 1822
Arachnion alborosellum Verwoerd 1926 [as alborosella]
Arachnion album Schwein. 1822
Arachnion firmoderma Verwoerd 1926
Arachnion giganteum Lloyd*
Arachnion scleroderma Lloyd 1915

Genus: Arcangeliella Cavara 1900 accepted as Lactarius Pers., (1797)
Arcangeliella africana  (Lloyd) Zeller & C.W. Dodge 1935 accepted as Neosecotium africanum (Lloyd) Singer & A.H. Sm., (1960)

Genus: Arctomia Th. Fr. 1861 (lichens) 
Arctomia muscicola A.L. Sm. 1932

Genus: Armillaria (Fr.) Staude 1857
Armillaria mellea Quel. (sic) possibly (Vahl) P. Kumm. 1871
Armillaria ramentacea Quel. (sic) possibly (Bull. ex Pers.) Gillet 1874, accepted as Tricholoma ramentaceum (Bull. ex Pers.) Ricken, (1915)

Genus: Arrhenia Fr. 1849
Arrhenia cucullata (sic)

Family: Arthoniaceae Rchb. 1841

Genus: Arthonia  Ach. 1806
Arthonia albida (Müll. Arg.) Willey 1890
Arthonia angulata Fée 1837
Arthonia angulosa Müll. Arg. 1887
Arthonia antillarum (Fée) Nyl. 1867
Arthonia argentea Stizenb. 1891
Arthonia calospora Müll. Arg. 1882
Arthonia capensis Stizenb. 1891 accepted as Tryblidaria capensis (Stizenb.) Vouaux, (1914)
Arthonia cinnabarina (DC.) Wallr. 1831 accepted as Coniocarpon cinnabarinum DC., (1805)
Arthonia circumscissa Merrill (sic)possibly Vain. 1890, accepted as Cyclographina circumscissa (Vain.) Makhija & Patw., (1995)
Arthonia consanguinea (Müll. Arg.) Willey 1890
Arthonia dispersa Nyl. (sic) possibly (Schrad.) Dufour 1818, accepted as Naevia dispersa (Schrad.) Thiyagaraja, Lücking & K.D. Hyde, (2020) or Arthonia dispersa subsp. excipienda (Nyl.) Nyl. 1861
Arthonia fusconigra Nyl. 1859
Arthonia gregaria (Weigel) Körb. 1855 accepted as Coniocarpon cinnabarinum DC., (1805)
Arthonia hormidiella Stirt. 1877
Arthonia lecideicarpa Zahlbr. 1932
Arthonia melanopsis Stirt. 1877
Arthonia nana Stizenb. 1891
Arthonia oblongula Müll. Arg. 1887
Arthonia obvelata (Müll. Arg.) Willey 1890
Arthonia palmicola Ach. 1814
Arthonia platygraphidea Nyl. 1863
Arthonia polymorpha Ach. 1814
Arthonia propinqua Nyl. 1863
Arthonia pyrenuloides Müll. Arg. 1887
Arthonia rubrofuscescens Vain. 1926
Arthonia variabilis Müll. Arg. 1887
Arthonia violascens Flot. ex Nyl.
Arthonia wilmsiana Müll. Arg. 1886

Genus: Arthopyrenia A. Massal. 1852
Arthopyrenia alboatra Müll. Arg. 1883
Arthopyrenia capensis Zahlbr. 1921
Arthopyrenia cinchonae (Ach.) Müll. Arg. 1883
Arthopyrenia cinchonae var. fumida (Stizenb.) Zahlbr. 1921 accepted as Constrictolumina cinchonae (Ach.) Lücking, M.P. Nelsen & Aptroot, (2016)
Arthopyrenia fallax (Nyl.) Arnold 1873 accepted as Pseudosagedia fallax (Nyl.) Oxner, (1956)
Arthopyrenia knysnana Zahlbr. 1932
Arthopyrenia leucanthes (Stirt.) Zahlbr. 1922
Arthopyrenia norata A. Massal. 1861
Arthopyrenia paraphysata Zahlbr. 1932
Arthopyrenia pruinosogrisea (C. Knight) Müll. Arg. 1894
Arthopyrenia recepta Müll. Arg. 1883
Arthopyrenia simulans Müll. Arg. 1887

Genus: Arthothelium A. Massal. 1852 (Lichens)
Arthothelium abnorme (Ach.) Müll. Arg. 1880
Arthothelium albidum Müll. Arg. 1887
Arthothelium album Zahlbr. 1932
Arthothelium argenteum (Stizenb.) Zahlbr. 1922
Arthothelium consanguineum Müll. Arg. 1888
Arthothelium fusconigrum (Nyl.) Müll. Arg. 1894
Arthothelium melanopsis (Stirt.) Zahlbr. 1922
Arthothelium michylum Vain. 1922
Arthothelium obvelatum Müll. Arg. 1887
Arthothelium phaeosporum Zahlbr. 1936
Arthothelium psyllodes Zahlbr. 1936
Arthothelium psyllodes var. precursum Zahlbr. 1936
Arthothelium violascens (Flot.) Zahlbr. 1922

Genus: Arthrobotryum Ces. 1854
Arthrobotryum melanoplaca Berk. & M.A. Curtis 1868 accepted as Spiropes melanoplaca (Berk. & M.A. Curtis) M.B. Ellis, (1968)

Genus: Arthrosporium Sacc. 1880
Arthrosporium parasiticum G. Winter 1886 accepted as Atractilina parasitica (G. Winter) Deighton & Piroz., (1972)

As

Genus: Ascobolus Pers. ex J.F. Gmel. 1792
Ascobolus ciliatus Berk. (sic) possibly J.C. Schmidt 1817 accepted as Lasiobolus papillatus (Pers.) Sacc., (1884) or Ascobolus ciliatus var. ciliatus Berk. 1836
Ascobolus ciliatus Schum.*
Ascobolus furfuraceus Pers. 1794
Ascobolus stercorarius (Bull.) J. Schröt. 1893 accepted as Ascobolus furfuraceus Pers., (1794)

Genus: Ascochyta Lib. 1830
Ascochyta alkekengi C. Massal. 1900
Ascochyta atropunctata G. Winter 1885
Ascochyta calpurniae G. Winter 1885
Ascochyta caricae Pat. 1891
Ascochyta cherimoliae  Thüm. 1879.
Ascochyta citricola McAlpine 1899
Ascochyta dianthi (Alb. & Schwein.) Berk. 1860 accepted as Septoria dianthi (Alb. & Schwein.) Desm., (1849)
Ascochyta kentiae Maubl. 1903
Ascochyta nicotianae Pass. 1881 accepted as Boeremia exigua (Desm.) Aveskamp, Gruyter & Verkley,  (2010)
Ascochyta papaveris Oudem. 1885, accepted as Diplodina papaveris (Oudem.) Lind, (1926)
Ascochyta parasitica Fautrey 1891 accepted as Sirococcus conigenus (Pers.) P.F. Cannon & Minter, (1983)
Ascochyta pisi Lib. 1830, accepted as Didymella pisi Chilvers, J.D. Rogers & Peever, (2009)

Genus: Ascophanus Boud. 1869
Ascophanus durbanensis Van der Byl 1925 accepted as Iodophanus durbanensis (Van der Byl) Kimbr., Luck-Allen & Cain, (1969)
Ascophanus granulatus (Bull.) Speg. 1878 accepted as Cheilymenia granulata (Bull.) J. Moravec,  (1990)
Ascophanus granuliformis (P. Crouan & H. Crouan) Boud. 1869 accepted as Coprotus granuliformis (P. Crouan & H. Crouan) Kimbr., (1967)
Ascophanus sp.

Genus: Ascostratum Syd. & P. Syd. 1912
Ascostratum insigne Syd. & P. Syd. 1912

Genus: Ascotricha Berk. 1838,
Ascotricha chartarum Berk. 1838

Genus: Aseroe Labill. 1800
Aseroe rubra Labill. 1800

Family: Ashbyaceae C.W. Dodge 1935

Genus: Ashbya Guillierm. 1928
Ashbya gossypii (S.F. Ashby & W. Nowell) Guillierm. (1928), accepted as Eremothecium gossypii (S.F. Ashby & W. Nowell) Kurtzman, J. (1995)

Genus: Aspergillus P. Micheli 1729
Aspergillus amstelodami (L. Mangin) Thom & Church 1926
Aspergillus candidus Link 1809
Aspergillus carbonarius (Bainier) Thom 1916
Aspergillus eburneus Biourge. accepted as Aspergillus neoniveus Samson, S.W. Peterson, Frisvad & Varga, (2011)
Aspergillus flavus Link 1809
Aspergillus fumigatus Fresen. 1863
Aspergillus glaucus (L.) Link 1809
Aspergillus minutus Gilman & Abott (sic) probably E.V. Abbott 1927;
Aspergillus niger Tiegh. 1867
Aspergillus ochraceus (series)
Aspergillus melleus Yukawa.
Aspergillus parasiticus Speare
Aspergillus repens (Corda) Sacc. (1882), valid on Species Fungorum  accepted as Aspergillus reptans Samson & W. Gams, (1986) per Mycobank 
Aspergillus repens-glaucus (series) (sic) possibly G. Wilh. 1877
Aspergillus sartoryi Syd. 1913
Aspergillus sulphureus (Fresen.) Thom & Church 1926
Aspergillus sydowi (Bainier & Sartory) Thom & Church 1926
Aspergillus terreus Thom 1918
Aspergillus versicolor (Vuill.) Tirab. 1908
Aspergillus welwitschiae (Bres.) Henn. 1907
Aspergillus sp.

Genus: Aspicilia A. Massal. 1852
Aspicilia nubila (Stizenb.) Hue 1912

Genus: Asterella (may refer to Asterella Rostr. 1888, accepted as Venturia; Venturiaceae, Asterella (Sacc.) Sacc. 1891, accepted as Asterina; Asterinaceae, or Asterella Hara 1936, accepted as Astrosphaeriella; Pleosporales)
Asterella infuscans (G. Winter) Sacc. 1891
Asterella phaeostroma (Cooke) Sacc. 1891
Asterella rehmii Henn. 1893 accepted as Placoasterella rehmii (Henn.) Theiss. & Syd., (1915)

Family: Asterinaceae Hansf. 1946

Genus: Asterina  Lév. 1845
Asterina africana (Van der Byl) Doidge 1942
Asterina africana var. kiggelariae Doidge 1942 accepted as Asterina africana (Van der Byl) Doidge, (1942)
Asterina aulica Syd. 1938
Asterina balansae var. africana Theiss.*
Asterina bosmanae Doidge 1942
Asterina bottomleyae Doidge 1942
Asterina capensis Kalchbr. & Cooke 1880 accepted as Meliola capensis (Kalchbr. & Cooke) Theiss.,  (1912)
Asterina capparicola [as capparidicola] Doidge (1942)
Asterina celtidicola Henn. 1905
Asterina celtidicola var. microspora Doidge 1920 accepted as Asterina celtidicola Henn. 1905
Asterina clausenicola Doidge 1920
Asterina combreti Syd. & P. Syd. 1910
Asterina combreti var. kutuensis v. Hohn*
Asterina confluens Kalchbr. & Cooke 1880
Asterina crotonicola Doidge 1922
Asterina crotoniensis R.W. Ryan 1939
Asterina delicata Doidge 1920
Asterina diplocarpa Cooke 1882
Asterina diplocarpa var. hibisci Doidge 1942 accepted as Asterina hibisci (Doidge) Hosag.,  (2004)
Asterina dissiliens (Syd.) Doidge 1942 accepted as Prillieuxina dissiliens (Syd.) Arx, (1962)
Asterina dissiliens var. senegalensis Doidge 1942 accepted as Prillieuxina dissiliens (Syd.) Arx,  (1962)
Asterina ditricha Kalchbr. & Cooke 1880
Asterina elegans Doidge 1942
Asterina erysiphoides Kalchbr. & Cooke 1880  accepted as Asterostomella erysiphoides (Kalchbr. & Cooke) Bat. & Cif., (1959)
Asterina excoecariae Doidge 1920
Asterina ferruginosa Doidge 1920
Asterina fimbriata Kalchbr. & Cooke 1880
Asterina fleuryae Doidge 1942
Asterina gerbericola Doidge 1924
Asterina gibbosa var. megathyria Doidge 1920, accepted as Asterolibertia megathyria (Doidge) Doidge, (1942)
Asterina grewiae Cooke 1882
Asterina grewiae var. zonata Doidge 1942 accepted as Asterina grewiae Cooke 1882
Asterina hendersoni Doidge 1920
Asterina inconspicua (Doidge) Doidge 1942 accepted as  Prillieuxina inconspicua (Doidge) Arx, (1962)
Asterina infuscans G. Winter 1885
Asterina interrupta G. Winter 1884 accepted as Vizella interrupta (G. Winter) S. Hughes, (1953)
Asterina knysnae Doidge 1942
Asterina loranthicola Syd. & P. Syd. 1914
Asterina macowaniana Kalchbr. & Cooke 1880
Asterina myriadea Cooke 1882
Asterina natalensis Doidge 1920
Asterina natalitia Doidge 1942
Asterina nodosa Doidge 1942
Asterina oncinotidis Doidge 1942
Asterina opaca Syd. & P. Syd. 1912
Asterina oxyanthi Doidge 1942
Asterina pavoniae Werderm. 1923
Asterina peglerae Doidge 1920
Asterina pemphidioides Cooke 1876
Asterina peraffinis Speg. 1889
Asterina phaeostroma Cooke 1882
Asterina polythyria Doidge 1920
Asterina punctiformis var. fimbriata (Kalchbr. & Cooke) Theiss
Asterina radiofissilis (Sacc.) Theiss. 1912
Asterina raripoda Doidge 1920 accepted as Maublancia raripoda (Doidge) Arx, (1962)
Asterina reticulata Kalchbr. & Cooke 1880
Asterina rhamnicola Doidge 1920 accepted as Schiffnerula rhamnicola (Doidge) S. Hughes, (1987)
Asterina rinoreae Doidge 1942 accepted as Asteridiella rinoreae (Doidge) Hansf. (1961)
Asterina robusta Doidge 1920
Asterina saniculae Doidge 1942
Asterina scolopiae Doidge 1922
Asterina secamonicola Doidge 1927
Asterina similis Cooke 1882
Asterina solaris Kalchbr. & Cooke 1880 accepted as Asterodothis solaris (Kalchbr. & Cooke) Theiss.,  (1912)
Asterina sphaerasca Thüm. 1875
Asterina streptocarpi Doidge 1924
Asterina stylospora Cooke 1882 accepted as Capnodiastrum stylosporum (Cooke) Petr., (1952)
Asterina syzygii Doidge 1942
Asterina tenuis G. Winter 1886
Asterina tertia var. africana Doidge 1920 accepted as Asterina tertia Racib. 1913
Asterina toruligena Cooke 1882
Asterina trichiliae Doidge 1920
Asterina trichocladi Doidge 1942 accepted as Maublancia trichocladii (Doidge) Arx, (1962)
Asterina uncinata Doidge 1920
Asterina undulata Doidge 1920
Asterina vagans Speg. 1888
Asterina vagans var. subreticulata Theiss*
Asterina vanderbijlii Werderm. 1923 [as van der Bylii]
Asterina vepridis Doidge 1942
Asterina woodiana (Doidge) Doidge 1942
Asterina woodii Doidge 1942
Asterina xumenensis Doidge 1942
Asterina zeyheri Doidge 1942

Genus: Asterinella Theiss. 1912
Asterinella acokantherae Doidge 1920 accepted as Lembosina acokantherae (Doidge) Arx [as 'acocantherae'], (1962)
Asterinella burchelliae Doidge 1920 accepted as Asterolibertia burchelliae (Doidge) Doidge, (1942)
Asterinella contorta (Doidge) Hansf. 1946
Asterinella dissiliens Syd. 1924 accepted as Prillieuxina dissiliens (Syd.) Arx, (1962)
Asterinella dissiliens var. senegalensis Doidge*
Asterinella inconspicua (Doidge) Hansf. 1948 accepted as Prillieuxina inconspicua (Doidge) Arx, (1962)
Asterinella lembosioides Doidge 1920 accepted as Echidnodes lembosioides (Doidge) Doidge, (1942)
Asterinella mimusopsis Doidge [as 'mimusopsidis'], (1922)
Asterinella pterocelastri Doidge 1924 accepted as Prillieuxina pterocelastri (Doidge) R.W. Ryan,  (1939)
Asterinella tecleae Doidge 1942
Asterinella woodiana Doidge 1920,

Genus Asterodothis Theiss. 1912
Asterodothis solaris (Kalchbr. & Cooke) Theiss. 1912

Genus: Asterolibertia G. Arnaud 1918
Asterolibertia burchelliae (Doidge) Doidge 1942
Asterolibertia megathyria (Doidge) Doidge 1942
Asterolibertia megathyria var. randiae Doidge 1942

Genus: Asteroma DC. 1815
Asteroma pallidum Kalchbr. (sic)*
Asteroma pullum Kalchbr. 1875

Genus: Asteromyxa Theiss. & Syd. 1918 accepted as Dimeriella Speg., (1908)
Asteromyxa inconspicua Doidge 1924 accepted as Prillieuxina inconspicua (Doidge) Arx, (1962)

Genus: Asterostomella Speg. 1886
Asterostomella eugeniicola Doidge [as 'eugenicola'], (1942)
Asterostomella reticulata v.Hohn.*
Asterostomella visci Doidge 1942

Genus: Asterostroma Massee 1889
Asterostroma cervicolor (Berk. & M.A. Curtis) Massee 1889

Genus: Asterostromella Höhn. & Litsch. 1907 accepted as Vararia P. Karst., (1898)
Asterostromella rumpiana P.H.B. Talbot 1948

Genus: Astrosporina J. Schröt. 1889 accepted as Inocybe (Fr.) Fr., (1863)
Astrosporina maritima (P. Karst.) Rea 1922 accepted as Inocybe impexa (Lasch) Kuyper, (1986)

Family: Astrotheliaceae Zahlbr. 1898

Au

Genus: Auerswaldia possibly Rabenh. 1857, accepted as Melanospora Ceratostomataceae, or Auerswaldia Sacc. 1883; Dothideaceae
Auerswaldia disciformis G. Winter 1884 accepted as Auerswaldiella winteri Arx & E. Müll., (1954)
Auerswaldia examinans (Berk.) Sacc. 1883 accepted as Bagnisiella examinans (Berk.) Arx & E. Müll., (1975)
Auerswaldia scabies (Kalchbr. & Cooke) Sacc. 1883 accepted as Phyllachora scabies (Kalchbr. & Cooke) Cooke, (1885)

Family: Auriculariaceae Fr. 1838

Genus: Auricularia Bull. 1780
Auricularia auricula-judae Seer. (sic) possibly  (Bull.) Quél. 1886
Auricularia delicata (Mont. ex Fr.) Henn. 1893
Auricularia eminii Henn. 1893 [as Emini]
Auricularia flava Lloyd 1922
Auricularia fuscosuccinea (Mont.) Henn. 1893
Auricularia lobata Sommerf. 1826 accepted as Auricularia mesenterica (Dicks.) Pers., (1822)
Auricularia mesenterica Fr. (sic) possibly (Dicks.) Pers. 1822
Auricularia mesenterica var. lobata Quel. (sic)*
Auricularia nigra P.Henn. (sic) possibly (Sw.) Earle 1899 accepted as Auricularia nigricans (Sw.) Birkebak, Looney & Sánchez-García, (2013)
Auricularia ornata Pers. 1827
Auricularia polytricha (Mont.) Sacc. (1885), accepted as Auricularia nigricans (Sw.) Birkebak, Looney & Sánchez-García,  (2013)
Auricularia squamosa Pat. & Har. 1893

See also
 List of bacteria of South Africa
 List of Oomycetes of South Africa
 List of slime moulds of South Africa

 List of fungi of South Africa
 List of fungi of South Africa – A
 List of fungi of South Africa – B
 List of fungi of South Africa – C
 List of fungi of South Africa – D
 List of fungi of South Africa – E
 List of fungi of South Africa – F
 List of fungi of South Africa – G
 List of fungi of South Africa – H
 List of fungi of South Africa – I
 List of fungi of South Africa – J
 List of fungi of South Africa – K
 List of fungi of South Africa – L
 List of fungi of South Africa – M
 List of fungi of South Africa – N
 List of fungi of South Africa – O
 List of fungi of South Africa – P
 List of fungi of South Africa – Q
 List of fungi of South Africa – R
 List of fungi of South Africa – S
 List of fungi of South Africa – T
 List of fungi of South Africa – U
 List of fungi of South Africa – V
 List of fungi of South Africa – W
 List of fungi of South Africa – X
 List of fungi of South Africa – Y
 List of fungi of South Africa – Z

References

Sources

Further reading

External links
Species Fungorum – a nomenclature database 
Name search at Index Fungorum

Fungi
Fungi A
South Africa